Kampar may refer to:

Indonesia
Kampar Regency, Riau Province, eastern Sumatra
Kampar River, a river in the same province

Malaysia
Kampar District, Perak
Kampar, Perak, a town in Kampar District
Kampar River, Malaysia, site of the 2009 Perak suspension bridge collapse

Ships
, a number of steamships with this name